Berrocal is a city located in the province of Huelva, Spain. According to the 2005 census, the city has a population of 371 inhabitants.

Demographics

References

External links
Berrocal - Sistema de Información Multiterritorial de Andalucía

Municipalities in the Province of Huelva